Corral de Comedias de Alcalá de Henares in Alcalá de Henares, Community of Madrid, Spain, is one of the oldest preserved theatres in Europe. Built in 1601-02 and designed to mirror the Corral de la Cruz in Madrid, the architect was Francisco Sánchez. 

It was built as a corral de comedias, a courtyard theatre.  However, it is no longer an open-air theater, like the Corral de comedias de Almagro, having been given a roof in a rebuilding in 1769.  Following use as a teatro romántico in the 19th century, and a cinema in the early 20th century, which led to major changes in the building's architecture, the building has been restored.

Current use
The corral is in active use as a theatre and seats 200 people.  Since 2005 it has been administered by the Fundación Teatro La Abadía.

References

Bibliography

External links
 Official website 

Buildings and structures completed in 1602
Theatres in Spain
Corral de comedias
Buildings and structures in Alcalá de Henares
1602 establishments in Spain